A body part is a part of an animal body.

Body part, Body Parts, or Bodyparts may also refer to:

Art, entertainment, and media
 Body Parts (film), a 1991 film starring Paul Ben-Victor and Kim Delaney
 "Body Parts" (Star Trek: Deep Space Nine), a 1996 episode of Star Trek: Deep Space Nine
 Bodyparts (1998), a novel by Theresa Breslin
 Bodyparts (album), a 2012 album by Dragonette
Body Parts (Cypress Hill album), 2000
 Body Parts (Prophet Posse album), 1998
 "Body Parts", a song by Three 6 Mafia from their album Chapter 1: The End
 "Body Parts 2", from their album Chapter 2: World Domination
 "Body Parts 3", from their album Most Known Unknown
 "Body Parts", a song from Albion (Ginger Wildheart album)
 "Body Parts", a 2010 song by Plain White T's from Wonders of the Younger

Other uses
 Organ trade, trade in body parts
 Vehicle body part, manufactured components of automobiles

See also
 Body (disambiguation)
 Body plan, morphological features shared by a group of related species
 Part (disambiguation)
 
 
 :Category:Body parts of individual people
 :Category:Egyptian hieroglyphs: parts of the human body
 :Category:Metaphors referring to body parts